Schizopus sallei is a species of false jewel beetle in the family Schizopodidae. It is found in North America.

Subspecies
These two subspecies belong to the species Schizopus sallei:
 Schizopus sallei nigricans Nelson in Nelson & Bellamy, 1991
 Schizopus sallei sallei Horn, 1885

References

Further reading

 
 
 

Schizopodidae
Articles created by Qbugbot
Beetles described in 1885